Futodama is a god in Japanese mythology, claimed to be the ancestor of Imbe clan, whose characteristics are believed to reflect the functions of the clan as court ritualists.

Name and etymology 
The god is known as Ame-no-Futodama-no-Mikoto or Futodama for short. His name is speculated to mean great gift or offering.

Myths 
After Susanoo accidentally killed one of Amaterasu's attendants in her weaving hall, she got upset and locked herself in Amano-Iwato causing the world to plunge into darkness, so Omoikane and other gods came up with a plan to get her out.

Futodama and Amenokoyane were tasked with performing a divination.

After Amaterasu left the cave, Futodama used a shimenawa to prevent her from going back to the cave again. This story is said to be the mythical origin of shimenawa.

In Kogo shūi, Futodama is placed as the leader of the preformed rituals.

Family 

 

In Kogo shūi Futodama is the child of Takuhatachijihime, and grandchild of Takamimusubi. But in many versions he is the son of Takamimusubi and the uncle to Ninigi.

Worship 

Futodama is believed to be enshrined at Awa shrine. Where there is a festival to the kami every year on August 10.  He is also enshrined at Amatsu Shrine alongside Ninigi and Ame-no-Koyane.  The Engi Shiki lists several shrines to Futodama in Izumi Province.

Popular culture 
In the Japanese role playing game Shin Megami Tensei IV Futotama is a level 42 demon. Futotama created other demons when fused, if he is fused with Virtue it creates Israfel. If Futotama is fused with Master Therion it creates Vivian.

References 

Shinto
Japanese gods
Imbe clan
Amatsukami